This is a list of cricketers who have played first-class, List A or Twenty20 cricket for Travancore-Cochin cricket team. Given are first and last seasons; the player did not necessarily play in all the intervening seasons. Players in bold have played international cricket.

A
P. M. Anandan

M
Acharath Mackey

P
Balan Pandit

R
P. M. Raghavan

S
Padmanabhan Sivadas, 1951/52

T
Kelappan Thampuran, 1951/52
Kerala Varma Kelappan Thampuran, 1951/52
Kochunny Thampuran, 1956/57

References

External links
Travancore-Cochin cricket team at CricketArchive
 First-class matches played by Travancore-Cochin at CricketArchive

Travancore-Cochin cricketers